Orlando Javier Rincón Reyes (born September 19, 1985) is a retired Mexican footballer who most recently played for Potros UAEM.

References

External links
 Puebla F.C. Player Page
 

1985 births
Living people
Club Puebla players
Atlante F.C. footballers
Chiapas F.C. footballers
San Luis F.C. players
Lobos BUAP footballers
Potros UAEM footballers
Liga MX players
Ascenso MX players
Association football defenders
Footballers from Morelos
People from Cuautla
Mexican footballers